David Parsons, is a New Zealand composer and multi-instrumentalist.

Trained as a Sitar player, Parsons started composing new age music in the early 80's with the two albums Sound of the Mother Ship and Tibetan Plateau produced by small California based label Fortuna Records. He then continued producing several albums of new age albums influenced by eastern instruments gaining a solid reputation in the genre.

Discography 
 1980 – Sound of the Mother Ship
 1982 – Tibetan Plateau
 1989 – Himalaya 
 1990 – Yatra
 1992 – Dorje Ling 
 1999 – Ngaio Gamelan	
 1999 – Shaman
 2000 – Parikrama
 2002 – Maitreya: The Future Buddha
 2004 – Vajra
 2004 – In Retrospect: 1980–2003
 2005 – Inner Places
 2008 – Surya
 2008 – Sand (ft. Jon Mark)
 2008 – Earthlight
 2009 – Jyoti
 2010 – Akash
 2013 – Stupa
 2016 – Puja
 2018 – Atmanaut
 2019 – Chakra

Notes

External links

Year of birth missing (living people)
Living people
New Zealand composers